No Problem is a Canadian animated short film, directed by Craig Welch and released in 1992. The film centres on a lonely man who wants to be in a relationship with a woman, but every time he goes on a date his id and superego both come out to wreck the opportunity.

The film was influenced by the comic style of NFB animators Cordell Barker and Richard Condie.

The film premiered at the 1992 Cannes Film Festival, in competition for the Short Film Palme d'Or. It was a Genie Award nominee for Best Animated Short Film at the 14th Genie Awards in 1993.

References

External links

1992 films
National Film Board of Canada animated short films
1990s animated short films
1992 animated films
1990s Canadian films